Morrenia odorata, the latexplant or strangler vine, is a plant in the family Apocynaceae, which is native to South America (Brazil, Bolivia, Argentina, Paraguay, Uruguay). This plant is cited in Flora Brasiliensis by Carl Friedrich Philipp von Martius. The species is widely cultivated as an ornamental.

homonym 
Morrenia odorata Hort. ex D.G. Kuntze not (Hook. & Arn.) Lindl. now  Mikania glomerata

References

External links

Morrenia odorata 
USDA Plants Profile: Morrenia odorata
  Flora Brasiliensis: Morrenia odorata

Asclepiadoideae
Flora of South America
Garden plants
Plants described in 1835